The 1927 Loyola Lions football team was an American football team that represented Loyola College of Los Angeles (now known as Loyola Marymount University) as an independent during the 1927 college football season. In their fourth season under head coach Harold Hess, the Lions compiled a 4–3–1 record and outscored their opponents by a total of 218 to 81.

Schedule

References

Loyola
Loyola Lions football seasons
Loyola Lions football